The 2015 Independence Bowl was a college football bowl game that was played on Saturday, December 26, 2015 at Independence Stadium in Shreveport, Louisiana in the United States.  The 40th annual Independence Bowl featured the Virginia Tech Hokies of the Atlantic Coast Conference against the Tulsa Golden Hurricane of the American Athletic Conference. Sponsored by Camping World, the game was officially known as the Camping World Independence Bowl. The first half of the game, in which 76 points were scored, was the highest scoring half in college football bowl history until the second half of the Famous Idaho Potato Bowl the next year.

Team selection
The game was to feature a team from the Atlantic Coast Conference against a team from the Southeastern Conference.  However, college football analyst Phil Steele projected prior to the game that neither an ACC nor an SEC team would be selected for the game, projecting that the Minnesota Golden Gophers of the Big Ten Conference and the San Jose State Spartans of the Mountain West Conference would be selected for the game instead.
Virginia Tech was chosen from the ACC, and Tulsa was chosen after the SEC did not have enough eligible teams.

Virginia Tech Hokies

With the announcement that he would retire after the season, Virginia Tech head coach Frank Beamer took the field one last time to coach the Hokies in the Independence Bowl. Beamer has led the Hokies to 23 straight bowl appearances in 25 seasons as an FBS team (Beamer has coached at VT for a total of 29 seasons). He held a 10–12 career bowl record going into this game. The Hokies won their final game of the season over rival Virginia on a last-second INT, gaining bowl eligibility and extending Beamer's career one more game.

Tulsa Golden Hurricane

This was Tulsa's first bowl appearance since a 31–17 win over Iowa State in the 2012 Liberty Bowl. It was also the first career bowl appearance for first-year head coach Philip Montgomery. The Golden Hurricane program was 9–10 all-time in bowl games but was 5–3 since 2003.

Game summary

Scoring summary

Statistics

References

Independence Bowl
Independence Bowl
Tulsa Golden Hurricane football bowl games
Virginia Tech Hokies football bowl games
Independence Bowl
December 2015 sports events in the United States